One Day at Disney Shorts is an American documentary streaming television series, composed of short episodes, produced by Disney Publishing Worldwide and Endeavor Content for Disney+. The series is a continuation of the documentary film One Day at Disney. The 51 short episodes, 5 to 7 minutes in length, were released weekly since its debut on December 6, 2019 until November 20, 2020.

Premise
The documentary is a shorts series. Each episode follows on a different The Walt Disney Company employee's job.

Episodes

Release
One Day at Disney Shorts premiered on December 6, 2019.

Reception
Joel Keller of Decider found One Day at Disney Shorts interesting among some of the stories it provides, stated it manages to be informative across its episodes, explaining it highlights the profession of various Disney employees, while claiming the series also serves as a promotional video for The Walt Disney Company. Emily Ashby of Common Sense Media rated the documentary 3 out of 5 stars, praised the series for its depiction of positive messages and role models, writing, "One Day at Disney is a docuseries that spotlights Disney employees to show how their creativity and vision bring the company's projects to life. [...] The content isn't a thrillfest, but the vignette format works to the advantage of tweens and teens who might want to see some of how the magic is made behind the scenes. What's more, the show inspires respect for a wide variety of careers and talent sets and demonstrates how teamwork and effective problem-solving are essential to Disney's success."

References

External links

2010s American documentary television series
2019 American television series debuts
Disney+ original programming
English-language television shows
Works about Disney